Amite may refer to:

 Amite City, Louisiana, town in and the parish seat of Tangipahoa Parish, Louisiana, US
 Amite County, Mississippi, county in the state of Mississippi
 Amite River, tributary of Lake Maurepas in Mississippi and Louisiana in the US